Blake Lee (born August 31, 1983) is an American actor, known for his roles on Mixology, Parks and Recreation and the Freeform hit Cruel Summer. Blake and his husband Ben Lewis made history starring in The Christmas Setup, Lifetime's first Christmas movie centered around a gay love story.

Filmography

Film

Television

Personal life
Lee is married to actor and writer Ben Lewis. The couple met in the Grauman's Chinese Theatre bathroom at the Scott Pilgrim vs. the World premiere after being told they had mutual friends. Lee had been attending as Aubrey Plaza's guest, the two have been close friends since Parks and Recreation.

References

https://people.com/tv/meet-married-couple-starring-in-lifetime-first-lgbtq-holiday-movie/

https://ew.com/tv/cruel-summer-blake-lee-premiere-spoilers/

https://deadline.com/2020/09/lifetime-cast-holiday-movies-the-christmas-setup-sugar-spice-holiday-fran-drescher-ben-lewis-jackie-lai-more-1234576224/

https://deadline.com/2021/04/cruel-summer-premiere-ratings-freeform-multi-platform-record-1234747822/

External links
 

American actors
American gay actors
Male actors from Miami
1983 births
Living people
21st-century LGBT people